Panchbibi railway station is a railway station in Joypurhat District, Bangladesh.

See also
 Joypurhat District
 Joypurhat railway station
 Bangladesh Railway
 Santahar railway station
 Kamalapur railway station

References

External links 
 Panchbibi Railway Station - পাঁচবিবি রেলওয়ে স্টেশন Facebook

Railway stations in Joypurhat District